Alliteration is the conspicuous repetition of initial consonant sounds of nearby words in a phrase, often used as a literary device. A familiar example is "Peter Piper picked a peck of pickled peppers".

Historical use 

The word alliteration comes from the Latin word littera, meaning "letter of the alphabet". It was first coined in a Latin dialogue by the Italian humanist Giovanni Pontano in the 15th century.

Alliteration is used in the alliterative verse of Old English, Old Norse, Old High German, Old Saxon, and Old Irish. It was an important ingredient of the Sanskrit shlokas.  Alliteration was used in Old English given names.  This is evidenced by the unbroken series of 9th century kings of Wessex named Æthelwulf, Æthelbald, Æthelberht, and Æthelred. These were followed in the 10th century by their direct descendants Æthelstan and Æthelred II, who ruled as kings of England.  The Anglo-Saxon saints Tancred, Torhtred and Tova provide a similar example, among siblings.

Today, alliteration is used poetically in various languages around the world, including Arabic, Irish, German, Mongolian, Hungarian, American Sign Language, Somali, Finnish, and Icelandic.  It is also used in music lyrics, article titles in magazines and newspapers, and in advertisements, business names, comic strips, television shows, video games and in the dialogue and naming of cartoon characters.

Types of alliteration
In literature, alliteration is the conspicuous repetition of identical initial consonant sounds in successive or closely associated syllables within a group of words, even those spelled differently. Some literary experts accept as alliteration the repetition of vowel sounds, or repetition at the end of words.  Alliteration narrowly refers to the repetition of a letter in any syllables that, according to the poem's meter, are stressed, as in James Thomson's verse "Come . . . dragging the lazy languid line along".

Consonance is a broader literary device identified by the repetition of consonant sounds at any point in a word (for example, coming home, hot foot). Alliteration is a special case of consonance where the repeated consonant sound is in the stressed syllable. Alliteration may also refer to the use of different but similar consonants, such as alliterating z with s, as does the author of Sir Gawain and the Green Knight, or as Anglo-Saxon (Old English) poets would alliterate hard/fricative g with soft g (the latter exemplified in some courses as the letter yogh – ȝ – pronounced like the y in yarrow or the j in Jotunheim).

Head rhyme or initial rhyme is a method of linking words for effect; for example, "humble house", "potential power play", "picture perfect", "money matters", "rocky road", or "quick question".  A familiar example is "Peter Piper picked a peck of pickled peppers".

Symmetrical alliteration is a specialised form of alliteration, which contains parallelism, or chiasmus. In this case, the phrase must have a pair of outside end words both starting with the same sound, and pairs of outside words also starting with matching sounds as one moves progressively closer to the centre. For example, "rust brown blazers rule" or "fluoro colour co-ordination forever". Symmetrical alliteration is similar to palindromes in its use of symmetry.

Examples of use

Literature

The Raven by Edgar Allan Poe has many examples of alliteration, including the following line: "And the silken sad uncertain rustling of each purple curtain".
Samuel Taylor Coleridge's poem The Rime of the Ancient Mariner has the following lines of alliteration: "The fair breeze blew, the white foam flew/ The furrow followed free".
Robert Frost's poem Acquainted with the Night has the following line of alliteration: "I have stood still and stopped the sound of feet".
The Lake Isle of Innisfree by W. B. Yeats has the following line of alliteration: "I hear lake water lapping with low sounds by the shore".
William Shakespeare's play As You Like It has the following lines of alliteration: "And churlish chiding of the winter’s wind/ Which, when it bites and blows upon my body".
James Thomson's poem  Autumn has the following lines of alliteration: "A pleasing calm; while broad and brown, below/ Extensive harvests hang the heavy head".
 In Walter Abish's novel Alphabetical Africa (1974) the first chapter consists solely of words beginning with "A". Chapter two also permits words beginning with "B", and so on, until in chapter 26, Abish allows himself to use words beginning with any letter at all. In the next 25 chapters, he reverses the process.
 Kalevala: The Karelian-Finnish national epoch book Kalevala written by Elias Lönnrot in the 1800s contains alliteration in the Eastern Finnish Karelian dialect, for example "Vaka vanha Väinämöinen", "Steady old Wainamoinen".

Rhyme
In "Thank-You for the Thistle" by Dorie Thurston, poetically written with alliteration in a story form: "Great Aunt Nellie and Brent Bernard who watch with wild wonder at the wide window as the beautiful birds begin to bite into the bountiful birdseed".
In the nursery rhyme Three Grey Geese by Mother Goose, alliteration can be found in the following lines: "Three grey geese in a green field grazing. Grey were the geese and green was the grazing."
The tongue-twister rhyme Betty Botter by Carolyn Wells is an example of alliterative composition: "Betty Botter bought a bit of butter, but she said, this butter's bitter; if I put it in my batter, it will make my batter bitter, but a bit of better butter will make my bitter batter better..."
Another commonly recited tongue-twister rhyme illustrating alliteration is Peter Piper: "Peter Piper picked a peck of pickled peppers. If Peter Piper picked a peck of pickled peppers, where's the peck of pickled peppers Peter Piper picked?".

Poetry 

Poets can call attention to certain words in a line of poetry by using alliteration. They can also use alliteration to create a pleasant, rhythmic effect. In the following poetic lines, notice how alliteration is used to emphasize words and to create rhythm:

"Give me the splendid silent sun with all his beams full-dazzling!' Walt Whitman, "Give Me the Splendid Silent Sun"

"They all gazed and gazed upon this green stranger,/because everyone wondered what it could mean/ that a rider and his horse could be such a colour-/ green as grass, and greener it seemed/ than green enamel glowing bright against gold". (232-236) Sir Gawain and the Green Knight, translated by Bernard O'Donoghue  (In the original, and in J. R. R. Tolkien's translation, this poem in fact follows an alliterative meter.)

"Some papers like writers, some like wrappers.  Are you a writer or a wrapper?" Carl Sandburg, "Paper I"

Alliteration can also add to the mood of a poem. If a poet repeats soft, melodious sounds, a calm or dignified mood can result. If harsh, hard sounds are repeated, on the other hand, the mood can become tense or excited. In this poem, alliteration of the s, l, and f sounds adds to a hushed, peaceful mood:

Rhetoric

Alliteration has been used in various spheres of public speaking and rhetoric. Alliteration can also be considered an artistic constraint that is used by the orator to sway the audience to feel some type of urgency, or perhaps even lack of urgency, or another emotional effect. For example, H or E sounds can soothe, whereas a P or a B sound can be percussive and attention-grabbing. S sounds can imply danger or make the audience feel as if they are being deceived. Other sounds can create feelings of happiness, discord, or anger, depending on context. Alliteration serves to "intensify any attitude being signified". Its significance as a rhetorical device is that it adds a textural complexity to a speech, making it more engaging, moving, and memorable. The use of alliteration in a speech captivates a person's auditory senses; this helps the speaker to create a mood. The use of a repeating sound or letter is noticeable, and so forces an audience's attention and evokes emotion.

A well-known example is in John F. Kennedy's Inaugural Address, in which he uses alliteration 21 times. The last paragraph of his speech is given as an example here.

"Finally, whether you are citizens of America or citizens of the world, ask of us here the same high standards of strength and sacrifice which we ask of you. With a good conscience our only sure reward, with history the final judge of our deeds, let us go forth to lead the land we love, asking His blessing and His help, but knowing that here on Earth God's work must truly be our own." — John F. Kennedy

Other examples of alliteration in some famous speeches:

 "I have a dream that my four little children will one day live in a nation where they will not be judged by the color of their skin but by the content of their character." — Martin Luther King Jr.
 "We, the people, declare today that the most evident of truths—that all of us are created equal—is the star that guides us still; just as it guided our forebears through Seneca Falls, and Selma, and Stonewall; just as it guided all those men and women, sung and unsung, who left footprints along this great Mall, to hear a preacher say that we cannot walk alone; to hear a King proclaim that our individual freedom is inextricably bound to the freedom of every soul on Earth". — Barack Obama.
 "And our nation itself is testimony to the love our veterans have had for it and for us. All for which America stands is safe today because brave men and women have been ready to face the fire at freedom's front." — Ronald Reagan, Vietnam Veterans Memorial Address.
 "Four score and seven years ago our fathers brought forth on this continent a new nation, conceived in liberty, and dedicated to the proposition that all men are created equal". — Abraham Lincoln, Gettysburg Address.
 "Patent portae; proficiscere!" ("The gates are open; depart!") — Cicero, In Catilinam 1.10.

Translation can lose the emphasis developed by this device. For example, in the accepted Greek text of Luke 10:41 the repetition and extension of initial sound are noted as Jesus doubles Martha's name and adds an alliterative description: Μάρθα Μάρθα μεριμνᾷς (Martha, Martha, merimnas). This is lost in the English NKJ and NRS translations "Martha, Martha, you are worried and distracted by many things."

Music lyrics
 "Helplessly Hoping" by Crosby, Stills, Nash & Young has rich alliteration in every verse.
 "Mr. Tambourine Man" by Bob Dylan employs alliteration throughout the song, including the lines: "Yes, to dance beneath the diamond sky with one hand waving free/ Silhouetted by the sea, circled by the circus sands."
 "Mother Nature's Son" by The Beatles includes the line: "Swaying daisies sing a lazy song beneath the sun."
 "Spieluhr" by Rammstein includes a spoken line: "Das kleine Herz stand still für Stunden" (eng. "The little heart stood still for hours). 
 "Fairyland Fanfare" by Falconer has a part that alliterates the "l" over 30 times: "Live the legend, live life all alone/ Longing to linger in lore/ Illuminating a lane/ That leads you aloft/ You're lost to the lunar lure/ Leave the languish/ Leave lanterns of lorn/ Lend lacking lustre to lies/ Liberate the laces/ Of life for the lone/ Lest lament yet alights“

See also 
 Alliteration (Latin)
 Anadiplosis
 Assonance
 Onomatopoeia
 Parachesis
 Tautogram

Footnotes

Notes

References

External links
 A collection of Dutch alliterations and related material (with sound files)
 Examples of alliteration in poetry (archived 2 October 2012)
 What is Alliteration? General introduction to alliteration with examples from poetry, music, and prose]

Poetic devices
Poetry articles needing expert attention

hu:Alliteráció